

The Beacon Hill Garden Club (est. 1928) of Boston, Massachusetts, is a private civic group devoted to green spaces and urban beautification in the neighborhood of Beacon Hill and elsewhere in the city. Founders of the club include artist Gertrude Beals Bourne. As of 2011, it aims to encourage "the love of horticulture and urban gardening" and to support "environmental conservation and civic improvement."

Since 1929, the club has organized an annual behind-the-scenes tour of selected private gardens in Beacon Hill. "They say if you can garden on Beacon Hill, you can garden anywhere in Boston. With more shade than sun, with soil that is laced with brick dust (from the old paved laundry yards), with imperious tree roots that heave up brickwork, it's a challenge to make a hidden garden something worth showing the public."

See also
 Garden club
 Urban horticulture

References

Further reading
 Beacon Hill opens hidden gardens to public for day. Daily Boston Globe, May 19, 1931
 Beacon Hill Gardens Plan 'Open House.' Christian Science Monitor,  Apr 28, 1953
 Clemens Kalischer. Hidden gardens of Beacon Hill : photographs. Boston : Beacon Hill Garden Club, 1959.
 Marshall, Alexandra; & al. Hidden Gardens of Beacon Hill: Creating Green Spaces in Urban Places, Boston : Beacon Hill Garden Club, Incorporated, 5th edition, 2013.  
 Linda Matchan. Rolling Out The Welcome Mat: At Historic Houses, Hidden Gardens. Boston Globe, May 15, 1980.
 Frances Minturn Howard et al. Hidden Gardens of Beacon Hill. Boston: Beacon Hill Garden Club, 1972, 1987.
 Carol Stocker. Celebrating The Creativity Behind Gardens Of Boston. Boston Globe, May 1, 2003. 
 Karen Cord Taylor. To Host Beacon Hill Garden Tour, Plant, Prune, And Cross Fingers. Boston Globe, May 19, 2005.

External links

 Flickr. Photos of annual garden tour, ca.2007
 Boston Athenaeum. Beacon Hill Garden Club minute book and scrapbooks, 1928-1959.

Beacon Hill, Boston
Annual events in Boston
Gardens in Massachusetts
Clubs and societies in Boston
Horticultural organizations based in the United States
1928 establishments in Massachusetts
1920s in Boston